is a town located in Iburi, Hokkaido, Japan. As of September 2016, the town had a population of 17,759. It was established in 1867 by the feudal lords of Sendai. Most of the area of the town is forested and parts lie within the Shikotsu-Tōya National Park.

History
Shiraoi, like the rest of Hokkaido, was populated by the Ainu. According to the town's official website, the name, Shiraoi, means Rainbows in the Ainu language. Other sources state that the name comes from Shiraunai meaning Horse-flies.

The following year the Boshin War caused Sendai to retreat from Shiraoi and return to Sendai proper. After the revolt was put down the government dismantled the fort in 1870.

The end of the 19th century saw expansion of the town. A road was established connecting Shiraoi with Muroran, Sapporo, and Hakodate in 1873. Nineteen years later, the first railroad station was established. The villages of Shadai and Shikiu were established. Two significant events occurred during this expansion: in 1874, Mount Tarumae erupted, and in 1881, the Emperor Meiji visited.

Geography
The town is  East to West and  North to South. 82% of this area is forested.

Shiraoi is crossed by a number of rivers running from the mountains like Mount Horohoro to the Pacific Ocean. These include:
 Shadai River
 Shiraoi River
 Shikyu River
 Betsubetsu River

Mount Horohoro and Lake Kuttara are part of Shikotsu-Tōya National Park. Lake Poroto is also in the area.

Climate
Shiraoi has an oceanic climate, mild when compared to the rest of Hokkaido. Shiraoi receives  of precipitation annually. In a typical year, the snow lingers for 80 days. Accumulated snow rarely exceeding . Wind velocity averages merely , that is less than half of the neighboring Tomakomai and Muroran.

Demographics
Shiraoi has a density of 42 persons per km².

Economy
In the 1930s, Shiraoi began the cultivation of mushrooms, such as Shiitake, and mullet roe (or karasumi) at Kojohama. Shiraoi imported the knowledge of mullet roe production from Iwanai.

Shiraoi has been involved in the harvest of marine products such as the Horsehair crab and konbu. Because of dwindling resources, harvesting of hair crab has been reduced to a test operation from the middle of July until the middle of August.

Shiraoi introduced the raising of beef cattle from Shimane Prefecture in 1954. In 1966, Shiraoi began with the production of chicken eggs. Shiraoi boasts 550,000 chickens, and a business worth ¥2.8 billion.

Arts and culture

Annual cultural events
Shiraoi has four annual festivals:
 Shiraoi Dosanko Winter Festival — early February
 Shiraoi Beef Festival — early June
 Shiraoi Port Festival — early August
 Shiraoi Cheipu Festival — early September

Museums and other points of interest

 The Ainu Museum, commonly known as Poroto Kotan – A natural history museum depicting a traditional Ainu village. Performers show traditional crafts and dances like the iomante rimse.
 Lake Kuttara
 Inkura Falls
 Mount Horohoro
 Ayoro Beach
 
 
 Kojohama hotsprings

Education

Elementary schools

Middle schools

Other schools

Infrastructure

Transportation
Shiraoi has several stations on the Muroran Main Line:
 Kojōhama
 Takeura
 Kita-yoshihara
 Hagino
 Shiraoi
 Shadai

Shiraoi is served by the following bus companies:
Donan bus Co.,Ltd
Hokkaido Chuo Bus Co., ltd.

Shiraoi is served by the following roads and highways:
 Hokkaidō Expressway
 Interchange at Shiraoi
 Parking area at Hagino
 National highways:
 Japan National Route 36
Prefectural roads:
 Hokkaidō Highway 86
 Hokkaidō Highway 350
 Hokkaidō Highway 388
 Hokkaidō Highway 701
 Hokkaidō Highway 1045

Sister cities
Shiraoi has the following twin city relationships:
  Quesnel, Canada since 1981
  Sendai, Japan since 1981
  Morita (now part of Tsugaru), Japan since 1991

Sports
The Shadai Stallion Station is located here. Shadai Stallion Station has bought high-profile thoroughbreds for their breeding program, such as Kentucky Derby winner War Emblem.

Notable people from Shiraoi
Giichi Nomura, advocate and activist for the Ainu people
Hiromi Yamamoto, speed skater

References

External links

 Official Website 
 The Ainu Museum Website

 
Towns in Hokkaido